Duncombe Park is the seat of the Duncombe family who previously held the Earldom of Feversham. The title became extinct on the death of the 3rd Earl in 1963, since when the family have continued to hold the title Baron Feversham. The estate has a commanding location above deeply incised meanders of the River Rye within the North York Moors National Park.

The house was completed in 1713 for Thomas Duncombe (born Thomas Brown) to designs by the Yorkshire gentleman-architect William Wakefield. It was remodelled in 1843 by Sir Charles Barry. In 1879 the main block was gutted by fire and remained a ruin until 1895 when rebuilding was carried out by William Young. The reconstruction was based on the original design, though there were changes made, especially in the interior layout to meet contemporary needs. It is of two storeys with a basement and attic.

The house itself is not open to the public but visitors are allowed into the  garden from April until the end of August.

History
In 1694 Charles Duncombe, one of the richest commoners in England, bought the  Helmsley estate, occasionally staying at the castle. After his death in 1711 it passed to his sister Ursula and from her to her son Thomas Brown, who changed his name to Thomas Duncombe and commissioned the building of the present house. On his death in 1746 it passed to his son, Thomas Duncombe II, who extended the grounds to include the Rievaulx Terrace. In 1774, Anne Duncombe, daughter of Thomas Duncombe of Duncombe Park was married to Robert Shafto, of Whitworth Hall, near Spennymoor, County Durham, the famous "Bonny Bobby Shaftoe" of the folk song.

In the late 1700s the estate was owned by Thomas' son, Charles Slingsby Duncombe, who was succeeded in 1803 by his eldest son and heir Charles. Charles was MP for Shaftesbury, Aldborough, Heytesbury and Newport IoW and High Sheriff of Yorkshire for 1790–91. He built up a considerable art collection at the house and was made 1st Baron Feversham in 1826. His son William succeeded him and was MP for Yorkshire and after 1832 for the new North Riding constituency. William's son William Ernest was created the 1st Earl of Feversham. The second Earl was killed in the First World War and the earldom became extinct on the death of the third earl in 1963.

The building was used as a girls' school between 1914 and 1980. The Rievaulx Terrace and Temples were acquired by the National Trust in 1972. After 1985 the house was restored as a family home by the 6th Baron Feversham, but on his death in 2009 it was left not to his heir Jasper Duncombe, 7th Baron Feversham, but to a younger son Jake Duncombe. It is a Grade I listed building.

The house closed to the public in 2011.

In 2012, Duncombe Park was used in filming the period drama TV mini-series Parade's End as the fictional Groby Hall 
in Cleveland, North Yorkshire. The film stars Benedict Cumberbatch and Rebecca Hall and is based on the novels by Ford Madox Ford. In 2013 it was used in the film The Thirteenth Tale, as Angelfield House. 

In March 2013 the National Centre for Birds of Prey opened a branch in the grounds.

Notes

External links

 
Duncombe Park - official site
Duncombe Park National Nature Reserve

Country houses in North Yorkshire
Sites of Special Scientific Interest in North Yorkshire
Gardens in North Yorkshire
Duncombe family
Grade I listed buildings in North Yorkshire
1713 establishments in England
Charles Barry buildings